Woizlawa Feodora Princess Reuss (née Duchess of Mecklenburg-Schwerin, 17 December 1918 – 3 June 2019) was a German royal and by birth member of the House of Mecklenburg-Schwerin. At the time of her death at the age of 100, she was the oldest living royal and the oldest living resident of Görwihl.

Since there are no males left in the family, the house is considered extinct due to the Salic law of succession.

Early life and ancestry
Duchess Woizlawa Feodore Elise Marie Elisabeth of Mecklenburg-Schwerin was born at Rostock, Free State of Mecklenburg-Schwerin on 17 December 1918, just after the abdication of her first cousin Frederick Francis IV of the Grand Duchy of Mecklenburg-Schwerin, and the establishment of the Weimar Republic. Her father was Duke Adolf Friedrich of Mecklenburg Governor of Togoland (in German West Africa) from 1912 until 1914. Her mother was Viktoria Feodora Reuss zu Schleiz (1889-1918). Her father was the seventh son of Frederick Francis II, Grand Duke of Mecklenburg-Schwerin (1823–1883) by his third wife Princess Marie of Schwarzburg-Rudolstadt (1850–1922). Her mother Princess Viktoria Feodora  was the eldest child of Heinrich XXVII, Prince of Reuss zu Schleiz, regent of Principality of Reuss-Greiz and Princess Elise of Hohenlohe-Langenburg, granddaughter of Princess Feodora of Leiningen, half-sister of Queen Victoria. Princess Viktoria Feodora died a day after Woizlawa's birth. 

She was named for Woizlawa, the daughter of Wartislaw I (d. 1135), Duke of Pomerania, and the wife of Pribislav (d. 1178), an Oborite prince and the first Duke of Mecklenburg. Her name was an acknowledgement that the House of Mecklenburg, although Germanized over the centuries, was originally of Slavic origins.

She was a first cousin of:
Cyril Vladimirovich, Grand Duke of Russia (1876–1938) pretender to the Russian throne after the assassination of his cousin Nicholas II of Russia.
Queen Alexandrine of Denmark (1879–1952), consort of Christian X of Denmark.
Cecilie, German Crown Princess (1886–1954), wife of William, German Crown Prince.
Queen Juliana of the Netherlands (1909–2004), queen regnant of the Netherlands.

Juliana's wedding
Preparations for the wedding of Queen Wilhelmina of the Netherlands' only child Crown Princess Juliana to the German Prince Bernhard of Lippe-Biesterfeld were underway in the 1937 when a diplomatic scandal occurred. Various members of his family and friends were aligned with the Nazis, and a number of them would attend the royal wedding. Protocol demanded that the prospective Prince-Consort be invited to an audience with his head of state, who at the time was Adolf Hitler. The affair resulted in Wilhelmina's opinion that the wedding be a family affair; consequently, she did not invite foreign royalty unless she was personally familiar with them. As a result, Juliana's chosen bridesmaids were either her relatives or relatives of her groom. These included Woizlawa herself (being first cousins), Duchess Thyra of Mecklenburg-Schwerin (her second cousin), Grand Duchess Kira Kirillovna of Russia (her first cousin once removed), Princess Sophie of Saxe-Weimar-Eisenach (her second cousin), and two of Bernhard’s first cousins, Princess Sieglinde and Princess Elisabeth of Lippe.

Marriage and family
On 15 September 1939, she married her distant relative Heinrich I Prinz Reuss (1910−1982) in Bad Doberan, who had been adopted in 1935 by her childless and unmarried uncle Heinrich XLV. Heinrich XLV had become an enthusiastic Nazi sympathizer and member of the Nazi Party in the early 1930s. In World War II he was Wehrmacht officer and in August 1945 arrested by the Red Army, and was presumed missing.

They had six children, one daughter and five sons.

Feodora Elisabeth Sophie Prinzessin Reuss (b. 5 February 1942) ⚭ Gisbert zu Stolberg-Wernigerode (b. 1942); has issue
Heinrich VIII Prinz Reuss (b. 30 August 1944) ⚭ Dorit von Ruffin (b. 1948); has issue
Heinrich IX Prinz Reuss (b. 30 June 1947) ⚭ Amelie Besserer von Thalfingen (b. 1959); has issue
Heinrich X Prinz Reuss (b. 28 July 1948) ⚭ Elisabeth Akerhielm af Margarethelund (b. 1946); divorced, has issue ⚭ Countess Antonia von Arnim (b. 1949); no issue
Heinrich XIII Prinz Reuss (b. 4 December 1951) ⚭ Susan Doukht Jaladi (b. 1956); has issue. Arrested as the figurehead of the right wing 2022 German coup d'état plot.
Heinrich XV Prinz Reuss (b. 9 October 1956) ⚭ Anja Charlotte Noothcooper (b. 1975); has issue

At the time of her death, she was one of the only remaining members of the House of Mecklenburg-Schwerin, after her cousins (twice-removed), Donata and Edwina.

Restitution claim

In 1935 Woizlawa Feodora's husband has been adopted by one of his relatives, Heinrich XLV, Hereditary Prince Reuss Younger Line, head and last male member of the House of Reuss Younger Line, for inheritance reasons, and after the latter's death in 1945 had become the sole heir of the private assets that had remained in the ownership of the House of Reuss Younger Line after its dethronement in the German Revolution of 1918. In 1945 however, the communist land reform in the Soviet occupation zone (East Germany) expropriated all movable and immovable assets of the House of Reuss. After the German reunification of 1990, she, as her husband's heir, claimed for restitution based on the fact that her late husband was of British nationality, as well as German, and should thus legally not have been expropriated under occupation law. Furthermore, a legal restitution claim for movable assets was passed by the Bundestag, leading to vast returns of museum items. In a settlement, the she also received Thallwitz castle and some forest property.

Ancestry

References

1918 births
2019 deaths
Duchesses of Mecklenburg-Schwerin
German centenarians
House of Mecklenburg-Schwerin
House of Reuss
People from Rostock
Princesses of Reuss
Women centenarians